Jakobinenstraße station is a Nuremberg U-Bahn station, located on the U1 in Fürth.

References

Nuremberg U-Bahn stations
Railway stations in Germany opened in 1974
1974 establishments in West Germany